Hexestrol diacetate (JAN) (brand names Retalon Lingual, Robal, Sintestrol, Sintofolin) is a synthetic, nonsteroidal estrogen of the stilbestrol group related to diethylstilbestrol. It is an ester of hexestrol, and was discovered in 1939.

See also 
 Hexestrol dicaprylate
 Hexestrol diphosphate
 Hexestrol dipropionate

References 

Acetate esters
Estrogen esters
Phenols
Stilbenoids
Synthetic estrogens